Sheryl Morgan (born 6 November 1983) is a Jamaican sprinter, who specializes in the 400 metres. She was born in Manchester, Jamaica.

Morgan won a bronze medal at the 2002 World Junior Championships. In the 4 x 400 metres relay she won the silver medal at the 2003 World Indoor Championships and the 2000 World Junior Championships and finished fourth at the 2002 World Junior Championships.

Her personal best time is 52.31 seconds, achieved in June 2001 in Nassau.

Achievements

References

1983 births
Living people
Doping cases in athletics
Jamaican sportspeople in doping cases
Athletes (track and field) at the 2011 Pan American Games
Jamaican female sprinters
People from Manchester Parish
World Athletics Indoor Championships medalists
Pan American Games competitors for Jamaica
21st-century Jamaican women